The alpha-2A adrenergic receptor (α2A adrenoceptor), also known as ADRA2A, is an α2 adrenergic receptor, and also denotes the human gene encoding it.

Receptor 
α2 adrenergic receptors include 3 highly homologous subtypes: α2A, α2B, and α2C. These receptors have a critical role in regulating neurotransmitter release from sympathetic nerves and from adrenergic neurons in the central nervous system. Studies in mice revealed that both the α2A and α2C subtypes were required for normal presynaptic control of transmitter release from sympathetic nerves in the heart and from central noradrenergic neurons; the α2A subtype inhibited transmitter release at high stimulation frequencies, whereas the α2C subtype modulated neurotransmission at lower levels of nerve activity

Gene 
This gene encodes α2A subtype and it contains no introns in either its coding or untranslated sequences.

Role in central nervous system 
Although the pre-synaptic functions of α2A receptors are often a major focus, the majority of α2 receptors in the brain are actually localized post-synaptically to noradrenergic terminals, and therefore aid in the function of norepinephrine. Many post-synaptic α2A receptors have important effects on brain function; for example, α2A receptors are localized on prefrontal cortical neurons where they regulate higher cognitive function .

Ligands

Agonists
 4-NEMD
 Brimonidine
 Clonidine
 Dexmedetomidine
 Guanfacine
 Lofexidine
 Myrcene
 Medetomidine 
 PS75
 Tizanidine
 Xylazine

Antagonists
 Idazoxan
 1-PP (active metabolite of buspirone and gepirone)
 Asenapine
 BRL-44408
 Clozapine
 Lurasidone
 Mianserin
 Mirtazapine
 Paliperidone
 Risperidone
 Yohimbine

See also 
Adrenergic receptor

References

External links

Further reading 

 
 
 
 
 
 
 
 
 
 
 
 
 
 
 
 
 
 
 
 

Adrenergic receptors
Biology of attention deficit hyperactivity disorder